Ochayee is a 2010 Tamil language drama film directed by O. Aasaithambi. The film stars newcomers Dhaya and Thamarai, with Rajesh, Santhana Bharathi, Ganja Karuppu, Shakeela, O. Murugan and Thiravi Pandian playing supporting roles. The film, produced by Thiraviya Pandian, had musical score by Jeevaraja and was released on 15 October 2010.

Plot

The film begins with the ruffian Mokkasamy (Dhaya) killing the village big-wig Nagarasu in Madurai.

In the past, Periyamaayan (Rajesh) was the father of the young Mokkasamy who had lost his mother at a very young age. To care of Mokkasamy, Periyamaayan decided to re-marry to a much younger woman but she then ill-treated Mokkasamy and disallowed intimacy with Periyamaayan. When Periyamaayan came to know about his second wife's extramarital affair with a stranger, Periyamaayan killed them both and was jailed, leaving his son alone. Therefore, Mokkasamy was struggling with no money and he did odd jobs. Karutha Pandi (Thiravi Pandian), a local rowdy with a golden heart, took Mokkasamy under his wing and considered Mokkasamy like his own son.

Many years later, after coming out of jail, Periyamaayan returns to his village and he is astonished to see his son Mokkasamy being arrested by the police. A constable told about his wife's illicit affair with Nagarasu to Mokkasamy thus an infuriated Mokkasamy killed Nagarasu. Karutha Pandi then bails Mokkasamy out of jail. Aandi Thevar (Santhana Bharathi), the village big-wig and Nagarasu's ally, urges to take revenge on Mokkasamy.

One day, the mother of Ochayee (Thamarai) dies and Periyamaayan brings Ochayee at his home. Mokkasamy, who became a misogynist after his stepmother's affair, spends his time humiliating and insulting his childhood sweetheart Ochayee. Thereafter, he falls in love with Ochayee. Karutha Pandi advises Mokkasamy to become a responsible man and to find a decent job. In the meantime, Aandi Thevar is killed by his mentally ill son and the villagers blame Mokkasamy for killing him, hence the police encounter Karutha Pandi and his henchmen. Mokkasamy, who is hiding from the police, marries Ochayee in a hurry with the blessings of Periyamaayan and the two plan to escape from the village. The couple in an autorickshaw is then hit by a lorry and they are killed in the accident.

Cast

Dhaya as Mokkasamy
Thamarai as Ochayee
Rajesh as Periyamaayan
Santhana Bharathi as Aandi Thevar
Ganja Karuppu as Azhagar
Shakeela as Pottu Kanni
O. Murugan as Ezharai
Thiravi Pandian as Karutha Pandi
Usman as Mottai
Usilai Bharathi as Oomaiyan
Rathnasamy as Police Inspector
Ochchu
Surulipatti as Yeththu
Haranram as Nagarasu
Sundar as Kudaloor Peyathevar
Vetri as Onapatti Rasu
Chandhini as Poocharam
Sindhu as Velammal

Production

O. Aasaithambi made his directorial debut with Ochayee under Aachi Kizhavi Thirai Koodam banner. Newcomers Daya and Thamarai were selected to play the lead roles, Rajesh, Santhana Bharathi, Ganja Karuppu and Shakeela were also part of the film. The camera was handled by Premshankar and the music scored by Jeevaraja. The film producer Thiraviya Pandian said that he had been scouting for a suitable story since 2006 and was really excited when the director narrated the story to him. He added that Ochayee is a village subject that he was keen on and decided to produce it. The film had been shot in Madurai, Usilampatti, Theni and Chennai. A reported decision by the State Commercial Taxes department refusing to exempt the film Ochayee from entertainment tax stating that the title is not a Tamil name has triggered a fresh debate. The film director garnered support from political leaders including CPI State secretary D. Pandian and VCK supreme Thol. Thirumavalavan. 'Ochayee' is a popular folk deity around Usilampatti in Madurai district.

Soundtrack

The film score and the soundtrack were composed by Jeevaraja. The soundtrack features 6 tracks with lyrics written by Snehan and O. Aasaithambi. The audio was released in 2010 in three different places: in Australia, at the Arulmigu Osandamman Temple in Pappapatti and at the AVM studio in Chennai.

Reception
The film was released on 5 October 2010 alongside four other films.

Sify said, "The director Asai Thambi has nothing new to say other than rehashing so many earlier 'Made in Madurai' films with more melodrama and violence". Another critic stated, "Ochayee is the usual thorough-fare that we are used to. A tried and tested formula, newcomers and the usual 'village' backdrop make this a dull watch" and called it "dull, disoriented and tedious".

References

2010 films
2010s Tamil-language films
Indian drama films
Films shot in Madurai
Films shot in Chennai
2010 directorial debut films